Anna Kristina Elisabet Hallberg, née Eriksson, (born 19 November 1963) is a Swedish politician for the Social Democrats. From 2019 to 2022, she served as the Minister of Foreign Trade and Minister for Nordic Cooperation.

She has previously been vice president of the state-owned enterprise Almi Företagspartner.

She is the domestic partner to Swedish politician and banker Anders Sundström.

References

|-

1963 births
Living people
People from Gothenburg
Women government ministers of Sweden
Swedish Ministers for Trade
Swedish Social Democratic Party politicians
21st-century Swedish politicians
21st-century Swedish women politicians
Swedish Ministers for Nordic Cooperation